Viscount  was a Japanese man who served as the daimyō of Tonami han (the former Aizu han) in the early Meiji Era. Born the eldest son of Matsudaira Katamori, he succeeded Katamori's adopted son Nobunori in 1869. As the Meiji government had granted the former daimyō family of Aizu a 30,000 koku holding in northern Honshū, Kataharu became its daimyō, with Katamori technically in his "care."

Kataharu became a member of the new kazoku in the Meiji Era, as well as an officer in the Imperial Japanese Army.

References
Miyazaki Tomihachi 宮崎十三八, "Matsudaira Katamori no shutsuji to sono ichizoku" 松平容保の出自とその一族, in Matsudaira Katamori no Subete 松平容保のすべて, ed. Tsunabuchi Kenjō 綱淵謙錠 (Tokyo: Shin Jinbutsu Ōraisha, 1984), p. 73.

|-

1869 births
1910 deaths
Daimyo
Kazoku
Meiji Restoration
Japanese military personnel
Aizu-Matsudaira clan